Jovan Novak (born November 8, 1994) is a Serbian professional basketball player for Fuenlabrada of the Liga ACB.

Professional career
Novak made his senior debut with Vršac. On April 2, 2014, he was loaned to Radnički Kragujevac for the rest of the 2013–14 season. In September 2014, he parted ways with Vršac.

On November 17, 2014, he signed a contract with Vojvodina Srbijagas for the 2014–15 season.

On July 31, 2015, Novak signed with the Polish club Turów Zgorzelec for the 2015–16 season. After the end of the Polish regular season, in late April 2016, he signed with Metalac Valjevo for the rest of the season.

On October 7, 2016, Novak signed with Mega Leks for the 2016–17 season. On November 21, 2017, Novak signed with Polish club MKS Dąbrowa Górnicza.

On October 30, 2020, Novak signed for Mega Soccerbet of the Basketball League of Serbia and the ABA League.

Serbian national team
Novak was a member of the Serbian U19 national team that won the silver medal at the 2013 FIBA Under-19 World Championship in the Czech Republic.

References

External links
 Jovan Novak at aba-liga.com
 Jovan Novak at eurobasket.com
 Jovan Novak at realgm.com
 

1994 births
Living people
ABA League players
Baloncesto Fuenlabrada players
Basketball League of Serbia players
KK Mega Basket players
KK Metalac Valjevo players
KK Radnički Kragujevac (2009–2014) players
KK Vojvodina Srbijagas players
KK Vršac players
Liga ACB players
Mitteldeutscher BC players
MKS Dąbrowa Górnicza (basketball) players
People from Vršac
Serbian expatriate basketball people in Spain
Serbian expatriate basketball people in Germany
Serbian expatriate basketball people in Poland
Serbian men's basketball players
Turów Zgorzelec players
Guards (basketball)